Peter de Boer (born 26 August 1971) is a New Zealand curler originally from Scotland. He currently skips the New Zealand national men's curling team.

Career
De Boer began curling in his native Scotland, where he played in the national championships and also played on the World Curling Tour. He finished in second place in the national championships in 2004 and 2005.

After moving to New Zealand in 2007, he began curling in New Zealand in 2010, and was selected to play on the national team after a runner-up finish in the New Zealand championships in 2011. De Boer led New Zealand to its best finish at the 2011 Pacific-Asia Curling Championships in recent years, winning a silver and a medal, and going to the world championships, where they finished in fifth place. However, at the 2012 Pacific-Asia Curling Championships, he led New Zealand to a less successful result, placing 6th.

Personal life
De Boer is married and has three daughters. He works as a general manager of a recruitment company. He studied at the University of Edinburgh.

External links
 
 Peter de Boer on the New Zealand Curling Association database

1971 births
Living people
New Zealand male curlers
Scottish male curlers
Scottish sportsmen
Sportspeople from Dunfermline
Scottish emigrants to New Zealand
New Zealand curling champions
21st-century New Zealand people